Bothriomyrmex atlantis is a species of ant in the genus Bothriomyrmex. Described by Forel in 1894, the species can be found in Algeria, Morocco, and Tunisia.

References

External links

Bothriomyrmex
Hymenoptera of Africa
Insects of North Africa
Insects described in 1894